Montgomery County is a county located in the southwestern area of the U.S. state of Iowa. As of the 2020 census, the population was 10,330. Its population has declined since a peak in 1900, since urbanization and decline of family farms. The county seat is Red Oak. The county was founded by European-American migrants from eastern areas in 1851. It was named in honor of Richard Montgomery, an American Revolutionary War general killed in 1775 while trying to capture Quebec City, Canada.

The county has been largely rural and devoted to agriculture. The county was first surveyed in 1852. It is famous as the location of the unsolved Villisca Axe Murders committed in 1912. Clyde Cessna, the founder of the Cessna Aircraft Company was born here.

Geography

Major highways
 U.S. Highway 34
 U.S. Highway 71
 Iowa Highway 48

Adjacent counties
Pottawattamie County  (northwest)
Cass County  (northeast)
Adams County  (east)
Page County  (south)
Mills County  (west)

Demographics

2020 census
There were 5,007 housing units, of which 4,456 were occupied.

2010 census
There were 5,239 housing units, of which 4,558 were occupied.

2000 census

At the 2000 census there were 11,771 people, 4,886 households, and 3,258 families in the county.  The population density was 28 people per square mile (11/km2).  There were 5,399 housing units at an average density of 13 per square mile (5/km2).  The racial makeup of the county was 98.20% White, 0.08% Black or African American, 0.35% Native American, 0.25% Asian, 0.01% Pacific Islander, 0.68% from other races, and 0.44% from two or more races.  1.30%. were Hispanic or Latino of any race.

Of the 4,886 households 29.70% had children under the age of 18 living with them, 54.40% were married couples living together, 8.70% had a female householder with no husband present, and 33.30% were non-families. 29.50% of households were one person and 14.70% were one person aged 65 or older.  The average household size was 2.36 and the average family size was 2.91.

The age distribution was 25.00% under the age of 18, 6.50% from 18 to 24, 25.50% from 25 to 44, 22.80% from 45 to 64, and 20.30% 65 or older.  The median age was 40 years. For every 100 females there were 90.20 males.  For every 100 females age 18 and over, there were 87.30 males.

The median household income was $33,214 and the median family income  was $40,129. Males had a median income of $28,531 versus $20,835 for females. The per capita income for the county was $16,373.  About 6.50% of families and 9.10% of the population were below the poverty line, including 12.30% of those under age 18 and 6.00% of those age 65 or over.

Communities

Cities
Coburg
Elliott
Grant
Red Oak
Stanton
Villisca

Unincorporated community
Pittsburg

Former towns
Alix (Douglas Township) 1895-98
Arlington (Washington Township)
Biddick (Pilot Grove Township) 1893-1902
Carr's Point (West Township) 1865-70
Climax (West Township) 1871-1901
Coe's Grove 1858-69
Flora 1859
Frankfort (County seat from 1864 to 1865) (Frankfort Township) 1856-78
Hawthorne 1871-1908
Oro 1856-1858
Ross Grove (Jackson Township) 1855-63
Rossville (Jackson Township) 1855
Sciola (Washington Township) 1855-1905
Wales (Lincoln Township) 1886-1901
Wallace (Douglas Township) 1875-78
Wilson (Pilot Grove Township) 1870-79

Townships

Douglas
East
Frankfort
Garfield
Grant
Lincoln
Pilot Grove
Red Oak
Scott
Sherman
Washington
West

Population ranking

The population ranking of the following table is based on the 2020 census of Montgomery County.

† county seat

Politics

See also

National Register of Historic Places listings in Montgomery County, Iowa

References

External links

Montgomery County, Iowa 

 
1851 establishments in Iowa
Populated places established in 1851